Bernard O'Hara (born c. 1945) is an Irish historian.

O'Hara, a native of County Mayo, Ireland, is a historian and a former registrar of the Galway-Mayo Institute of Technology (GMIT). One of the original members of staff when the GMIT opened in September 1972, Mr. O'Hara started his academic career as a lecturer in business studies, later serving for 19 years as the Head of the School of Business and Humanities. He was then promoted to Registrar of the college, where he served for 11 years until September 2010.

O'Hara is a former president of the Galway Archaeological and Historical Society and was a director of the Galway Chamber of Commerce and Industry for over a decade. Known as "one of Ireland's foremost scholars on Davitt," O'Hara wrote a concise biography of Michael Davitt, first published in 2006 by Mayo County in association with the Michael Davitt Memorial Association. O'Hara has published a dozen books and numerous articles on Irish history. In a recent publication, Killasser: Heritage of a Mayo Parish, he provides an overview of Irish history with a focus on the ordinary lives of those living in the rural parish. In 2017 O'Hara published Exploring Mayo, an illustrated book about the landscape, baronies, parishes, leisure and cultural attractions as well as the archaeological and historical heritage of County Mayo.

O'Hara's specialist subjects include archeology, Irish place-names, education, County Mayo, farming, Irish emigration, the Catholic Church, rural history, Irish mythology, sport and Irish genealogy as well as the growth of modern Ireland.

Select bibliography

 Killasser: A History, 1981 - OCLC No.: 10823631
 Touring Mayo: A Guide to County Mayo, Ireland, 1994 - OCLC No. 244642471 
 The Evolution of Irish Industrial Relations Law and Practice, 1981 - ASIN: B0006EAHKI
 Mayo:Aspects of its Heritage, 1982 - 
 Michael Davitt Remembered, 1984 - ASIN: B0006EGR34
 The Archaeological Heritage of Killasser, County Mayo, 1991 - 
 Regional Technical College: The First 21 Years, 1993 - 
 Davitt: Irish Patriot and Father of the Land League, 2009 - 
 Entrepreneurship in Ireland, 2011 - 
 Killasser: Heritage of a Mayo Parish, 2012 - 
 Exploring Mayo, 2017 -

References

External links
 http://www.bernardohara.com
 http://www.goodreads.com/Bernard_OHara
 

20th-century Irish historians
21st-century Irish historians
People from County Mayo
Living people
Year of birth missing (living people)